Sharip Varayev (born 13 August 1969) is a Russian judoka. He competed in the men's half-middleweight event at the 1992 Summer Olympics.

References

External links
 

1969 births
Living people
Russian male judoka
Olympic judoka of the Unified Team
Judoka at the 1992 Summer Olympics
Sportspeople from Grozny